The Mande languages are spoken in several countries in West Africa by the Mandé peoples and include Maninka, Mandinka, Soninke, Bambara, Kpelle, Dioula, Bozo, Mende, Susu, and Vai. There are "60 to 75 languages spoken by 30 to 40 million people", chiefly in Burkina Faso, Mali, Senegal, the Gambia, Guinea, Guinea-Bissau, Sierra Leone, Liberia, and Ivory Coast, and also in northwestern Nigeria and northern Benin.

The Mande languages show lexical similarities with the Atlantic–Congo language family, and the two have been classified together as a Niger–Congo language family since the 1950s. However, the Mande languages lack the noun-class morphology that is the primary identifying feature of the Atlantic–Congo languages. Without the help of that feature, a demonstration of the validity of Niger–Congo will require reconstructing both Proto-Mande and Proto-Atlantic–Congo. Until that work is done, linguists have increasingly decided to treat Mande and Atlantic–Congo as independent language families.

Homeland
Valentin Vydrin concluded that "the Mande homeland at the second half of the 4th millennium BC was located in Southern Sahara, somewhere to the North of 16° or even 18° of Northern latitude and between 3° and 12° of Western longitude.". That is now Mauritania and southern Western Sahara.

History
The group was first recognized in 1854 by Sigismund Wilhelm Koelle, in his Polyglotta Africana. He mentioned 13 languages under the heading North-Western High-Sudan Family, or Mandéga Family of Languages. In 1901, Maurice Delafosse made a distinction of two groups. He speaks of a northern group mandé-tan and a southern group mandé-fu. The distinction was basically done only because the languages in the north use the expression tan for ten, and the southern languages use fu. In 1924, Louis Tauxier noted that the distinction is not well founded and there is at least a third subgroup he called mandé-bu. It was not until 1950 that André Prost supported that view and gave further details.

In 1958, Welmers published an article called "The Mande Languages," where he divided the languages into three subgroups: North-West, South and East. His conclusion was based on lexicostatistic research. Joseph Greenberg followed that distinction in his The Languages of Africa (1963). Long (1971) and Gérard Galtier (1980) follow the distinction into three groups but with notable differences.

Various opinions exist as to the age of the Mande languages. Greenberg has suggested that the Niger-Congo group, which in his view includes the Mande language family, began to break up at around 7000 years BP. Its speakers practised a Neolithic culture, as indicated by the Proto-Niger-Congo words for "cow", "goat" and "cultivate".

The Mande languages are considered to be an independent language family by Dimmendaal (2011).

Classification

Relation to Niger-Congo
Mande does not share the morphology characteristic of most of the Niger–Congo family, such as the noun-class system. Blench regards it as an early branch that, like Ijoid and perhaps Dogon, diverged before this morphology developed. Dwyer (1998) compared it with other branches of Niger–Congo and finds that they form a coherent family, with Mande being the most divergent of the branches he considered.

However, Dimmendaal (2008) argues that the evidence for inclusion is slim, and that for now Mande is best considered an independent family. The same view is held by Güldemann (2018).

Without definitively concluding that Mande is or is not a member of Niger–Congo, Vydrin (2016) notes that proto-Mande basic vocabulary fits relatively well with Niger–Congo, and that typological criteria such as the absence of a noun-class system should not be taken as probative; he notes that "If the position of Mande within Niger-Congo is confirmed... Mande will certainly represent the most ancient branching of the phylum".

Internal classification
The diversity and depth of the Mande family is comparable to that of Indo-European. Eleven low-level branches of Mande are nearly universally accepted: Southern Mande (Dan etc.), Eastern Mande (Bisa, Boko etc.), Samogo, Bobo, Soninke–Bozo, Southwestern Mande (Mende, Kpelle, Loma etc.), Soso–Jalonke, Jogo, Vai–Kono, Mokole and Manding (Bambara, Djula etc.). It is also widely accepted that these form two primary branches, the first two as Southeastern Mande and the rest as Western Mande.

Most internal Mande classifications are based on lexicostatistics. See, for example,  based on the Swadesh list). An alternative classification from Kastenholz (1996) is based on lexical innovations and comparative linguistics. Note however that Kastenholz warns that this is not based on objective criteria and thus is not a genealogical classification in the narrow sense. The following classification is a compilation of both.

Vydrin (2009) differs somewhat from this: he places Soso-Jalonke with Southwestern (a return to André Prost 1953); Soninke-Bozo, Samogho and Bobo as independent branches of Western Mande, and Mokole with Vai-Kono. Most classifications place Jo within Samogo.

Morphosyntactic features
Mande languages do not have the noun-class system or verbal extensions of the Atlantic–Congo languages and for which the Bantu languages are so famous, but Bobo has causative and intransitive forms of the verb. Southwestern Mande languages and Soninke have initial consonant mutation. Plurality is most often marked with a clitic; in some languages, with tone, as for example in Sembla. Pronouns often have alienable–inalienable and inclusive–exclusive distinctions. Word order in transitive clauses is subject–auxiliary–object–verb–adverb. Mainly postpositions are used. Within noun phrases, possessives come before the noun, and adjectives and plural markers after the verb; demonstratives are found with both orders.

Comparative vocabulary 
Below is a sample basic vocabulary of reconstructed proto-forms:

Note that in these cognates:
'saliva' = 'mouth'+'water'
'milk' = 'breast'+'water'
'buck (he-goat)' = 'goat'+'male'
'ram' = 'sheep'+'male'

Numerals
Comparison of numerals in individual languages:

See also
List of Proto-Mande reconstructions (Wiktionary)
List of Proto-West Mande reconstructions (Wiktionary)
Manding languages
Mandé
Mende language

References

Sources
 Bimson, Kent (1976). Comparative reconstruction of Mandekan. In Studies in African Linguistics, Vol 7, No 3 (1976).
 Delafosse, Maurice (1901) Essai de manuel pratique de la langue mandé ou mandingue. Paris : Leroux. 304 p.
 Delafosse, Maurice (1904) Vocabulaires comparatifs de plus de soixante langues ou dialectes parlés à la Ivory Coast et dans les régions limitrophes, avec des notes linguistiques et ethnologiques. Paris : Leroux. 285 p.
 Halaoui, Nazam, Kalilou Tera, Monique Trabi (1983) Atlas des langues mandé – sud de Ivory Coast. Abidjan : ACCT-ILA.
 Kastenholz, Raimund (1996) Sprachgeschichte im West-Mande: Methoden und Rekonstruktionen. Mande Languages and Linguistics · Langues et Linguistique Mandé, 2. Köln : Rüdiger Köppe Verlag. 281 p.
 Perekhvalskaya, Elena & Vydrin, Valentin. Numeral systems in Mande languages. Mandenkan 61, 2019, pp. 47–111.
 Steinthal, Heymann (1867) Die Mande-Negersprachen, psychologisch und phonetisch betrachtet. Berlin: Schade. 344 p.
 Sullivan, Terrence D. 2004 [1983]. A preliminary report of existing information on the Manding languages of West Africa: Summary and suggestions for future research. SIL Electronic Survey Report. Dallas, SIL International.
Vydrine, Valentin, T.G. Bergman and Matthew Benjamin (2000) Mandé language family of West Africa: Location and genetic classification. SIL Electronic Survey Report. Dallas, SIL International.
Vydrin, Valentin. On the problem of the Proto-Mande homeland // Вопросы языкового родства – Journal of Language Relationship 1, 2009, pp. 107–142.
Vydrin, Valentin. Toward a Proto-Mande reconstruction and an etymological dictionary. Faits de Langues 47, 2016, pp. 109–123.
 Vydrin, Valentin. Mande languages. Oxford Research Encyclopedias: Linguistics. Oxford University Press, 2018.
 Welmers, William E.(1971) Niger–Congo, Mande. In Linguistics in Sub-Saharan Africa (Current Trends in Linguistics,7), Thomas A. Sebeok, Jade Berry, Joseph H. Greenberg et al. (eds.), 113–140. The Hague: Mouton.
 Williamson, Kay, and Roger Blench (2000) "Niger–Congo". In Heine & Nurse, eds., African Languages.

External links
LANGUES MANDE
 Mande page of the Journal of West African Languages
Journal Mandenkan (introduction)

 
Language families
Niger–Congo languages